William Davis (born March 6, 1959) is an American former professional darts player who played in events of the Professional Darts Corporation (PDC).

Career

Davis made his televised debut in the United States, taking part in the World Series of Darts in 2006, losing in the first round to Denis Ovens in a tight game. Davis qualified for the Las Vegas Desert Classic the same year, but lost in round one to Terry Jenkins.

Davis then qualified for the 2007 PDC World Darts Championship where he was beaten by Andy Jenkins in the first round. He followed this with a third round showing in the 2007 US Open, losing to Kevin Painter. Davis then reached the last 16 of the PDPA Players Championship in Las Vegas, but failed to qualify for the Desert Classic.

Davis reached the semi final of the North American Darts Championship on the eve of the 2008 US Open, losing to eventual winner Darin Young. He then reached the last 16 of the US Open, defeating Tony Eccles before losing to surprise package David Fatum who went on to reach the semi finals. He also qualified for the 2008 Desert Classic through the US Order of Merit, losing in the first round to Mark Walsh.

Davis finished second in the American Order of Merit which earned him a spot in the 2009 PDC World Darts Championship.  He defeated reigning champion John Part in the first round by three sets to nil, in what was one of the biggest upsets in darting history. He then lost in the second round to Welshman Barrie Bates.

Davis Quit the BDO in 2017.

World Championship results

PDC

2007: 1st Round (lost to Andy Jenkins 1–3) (sets) 
2009: 2nd Round (lost to Barrie Bates 2–4)

External links
Profile and stats on Darts Database

American darts players
Living people
1959 births
Professional Darts Corporation former pro tour players
British Darts Organisation players
PDC World Cup of Darts American team